Alessio Zerbin (born 3 March 1999) is an Italian professional footballer who plays as a forward for Serie A club Napoli and the Italy national team.

Club career
Zerbin started his senior career with Gozzano in Serie D in the 2015–16 season.

He signed with Napoli on 31 January 2017. He was assigned to their Under-19 squad and scored four goals in the 2017–18 UEFA Youth League. He made one bench appearance for Napoli's senior squad, late in the 2016–17 Serie A season.

On 19 July 2018, he joined Serie C club Viterbese Castrense on a season-long loan. He made his Serie C debut for Viterbese Castrense on 3 November 2018 in a game against Rieti as a 69th-minute substitute for Simone Palermo.

On 24 July 2019, he joined Cesena on loan.

On 17 September 2020, he joined Pro Vercelli on loan.

On 28 July 2021. he joined Serie B side Frosinone on loan.
He scored his first Frosinone goal on 20 August 2021, past Italian football legend Gianluigi Buffon, in his first league game against Parma.

International career
In the spring of 2017, Zerbin played in several friendlies for Italy U18 national team and scored a goal against Denmark.

He was selected in the senior Italy squad for the 2022 Finalissima against Argentina on 1 June 2022 and for 2022–23 UEFA Nations League group stage matches against Germany, Hungary, England and Germany between 4 and 14 June 2022. He made his full international debut as a substitute on 7 June 2022 in a 2–1 win against Hungary in the UEFA Nations League.

References

External links

Profile at the S.S.C. Napoli website
 

Living people
1999 births
People from Novara
Sportspeople from the Province of Novara
Italian footballers
Footballers from Piedmont
Association football forwards
Italy international footballers
Italy youth international footballers
Serie A players
Serie B players
Serie C players
Serie D players
S.S.C. Napoli players
U.S. Viterbese 1908 players
Cesena F.C. players
F.C. Pro Vercelli 1892 players
Frosinone Calcio players